St. Mang is a traditional, regional form of the name of Saint Magnus of Füssen.

St. Mang is the name of the following churches and abbeys in Germany:

Saint Mang Abbey (Füssen)
St. Mang (Regensburg)
St. Mang (Kempten)